The county of Northumberland has returned four MPs to the UK Parliament since 1983. Under the Local Government Act 1972, which came into effect on 1 April 1974, the boundaries of the historic/administrative county were significantly altered with the south-east of the county, comprising more than half the electorate, being transferred to the new metropolitan county of Tyne and Wear. These changes were reflected in the following redistribution of parliamentary seats which did not come into effect until the 1983 general election, resulting in a reduction in the county's representation from 10 to 4 MPs.

Number of seats 
The table below shows the number of MPs representing Northumberland at each major redistribution of seats affecting the county.

1Prior to 1950, seats were classified as County Divisions or Parliamentary Boroughs. Since 1950, they have been classified as County or Borough Constituencies.

2Approximate equivalent number of constituencies. Prior to the redistribution coming into effect for the 1983 general election, two constituencies were split between Northumberland and Tyne and Wear and two were wholly within the reconfigured county.

Constituencies timeline

Boundary reviews

Prior to 1832 
Since 1290, the Parliamentary County of Northumberland, along with all other English counties regardless of size or population, had elected two MPs (Knights of the Shire) to the House of Commons.

The county also included three Parliamentary Boroughs, namely Berwick-upon-Tweed, Morpeth and Newcastle upon Tyne, all returning two MPs (burgesses) each.

1832 
The Great Reform Act of 1832 radically changed the representation of the House of Commons, with the County being divided into the Northern and Southern Divisions, both returning two MPs. The representation of Morpeth, which included the parish of Bedlington, was reduced to one MP. Tynemouth was established as a single-member Borough - named  Tynemouth and North Shields under the Parliamentary Boundaries Act 1832.

1868 
Under the Boundary Act 1868, the boundaries of Morpeth were further extended to include the townships of Cowpen and Newsham (which incorporprated the town of Blyth). There were no other changes.

1885 
Under the Redistribution of Seats Act 1885, the two two-member county divisions were replaced by four single-member constituencies, namely Berwick-upon-Tweed, Wansbeck, Hexham and Tyneside. The Parliamentary Borough of Berwick-upon-Tweed was abolished. Tynemouth and North Shields became known as Tynemouth, with no changes to its boundaries.

1918 
Under the Representation of the People Act 1918, the number of constituencies in Northumberland was increased back up to 10 as the two-member borough of Newcastle upon Tyne was replaced by four Divisions – Central, East, North and West.

The County Division of Tyneside was abolished and its contents distributed as follows:

 the majority of the electorate, comprising the municipal borough of Wallsend and the urban districts of Gosforth, Longbenton and Weetslade formed the new Parliamentary Borough of Wallsend;
 the former urban districts of Walker, and Benwell and Fenham which had been abolished in 1904 and absorbed into the County Borough of Newcastle upon Tyne were included in Newcastle upon Tyne East and West respectively; and
 the urban district of Newburn and surrounding rural areas were transferred to Wansbeck.

Elsewhere, Berwick-upon-Tweed gained Amble from Wansbeck and Rothbury from Hexham, and Ashington was transferred from Wansbeck to Morpeth.

1950 
As a result of the redistribution enacted by the Representation of the People Act 1948, Northumberland's representation remained at 10 MPs.

A new borough constituency named Blyth was established, which included the towns of Blyth and Bedlington, previously part of Morpeth. Wansbeck was abolished with its contents distributed as follows:

 rural areas around Morpeth, including Newbiggin-by-the-Sea, to Morpeth;
 Seaton Valley urban district (incorporating Cramlington, Seghill, Earsdon and Seaton Delaval) to Blyth;
 Whitley Bay to Tynemouth;
 rural areas to the west of Newcastle upon Tyne to Hexham; and
 Newburn to Newcastle upon Tyne West – necessitating the redrawing of the boundaries of the other three Newcastle upon Tyne seats.

1955 
There was only one change resulting from the First Periodic Review of Westminster constituencies – the transfer of Benwell ward from Newcastle upon Tyne West to Newcastle upon Tyne Central.

1974 (Feb) 
There were no changes resulting from the Second Periodic Review, which came into effect for the February 1974 election.

1974 (Apr) 
Shortly after the Second Periodic Review came into effect, the county was subject to a major reconfiguration under the terms of the Local Government Act 1972. As a result, with effect from 1 April 1974, the four Newcastle upon Tyne constituencies and those of Wallsend and Tynemouth1, together with small areas of Hexham and Blyth, became part of the metropolitan county of Tyne and Wear.

1 Apart from the small community of Seaton Sluice.

1983 
The next change to parliamentary constituency boundaries, following the recommendations of the Third Periodic Review, reflected the change in county boundaries and reorganisation of local government authorities in 1974. This review did not come into effect for a further nine years, at the 1983 general election, and resulted in the following changes:
 Morpeth was abolished and, with the exception of northern rural areas which were transferred to Berwick-upon-Tweed, its contents formed the bulk of the re-established constituency of Wansbeck (which had very little in common with the original constituency);
 Blyth was renamed Blyth Valley, with Bedlington being included in Wansbeck; and
 the small areas of Blyth (Earsdon and Backworth) and Hexham (part of Castle Ward rural district) which had been absorbed into the new county of Tyne and Wear were transferred to Wallsend and Newcastle upon Tyne North respectively.

1997 
There were no changes under the Fourth Review.

2010 
At the Fifth Review there were only minor changes due to the revision of local authority ward boundaries.

Maps

Communities timeline 
The table below shows which constituencies represented major communities within the current county from 1885 onwards.

See also 
 List of parliamentary constituencies in Northumberland
 History of parliamentary constituencies and boundaries in Tyne and Wear

References

Parliamentary constituencies in Northumberland